Razoredge Mountain is located in the Lewis Range, Glacier National Park in the U.S. state of Montana.

Geology 

Like other mountains in Glacier National Park, Razoredge Mountain is composed of sedimentary rock laid down during the Precambrian to Jurassic periods.

Climate 
According to the Köppen climate classification system, Razoredge Mountain is located in an alpine subarctic climate zone with long, cold, snowy winters, and cool to warm summers. Winter temperatures can drop below −10 °F with wind chill factors below −30 °F. Due to its altitude, it receives precipitation all year, as snow in winter, and as thunderstorms in summer.

Gallery

See also
 Mountains and mountain ranges of Glacier National Park (U.S.)

References

Mountains of Flathead County, Montana
Razoredge Mountain
Lewis Range
Mountains of Montana